Thaddeus Cowan Lewis (born November 19, 1987) is an American football coach and former quarterback who is the quarterbacks coach for the Tampa Bay Buccaneers of the National Football League (NFL). He was signed by the St. Louis Rams as an undrafted free agent in 2010. He played college football at Duke. Lewis was also a member of the Cleveland Browns, Detroit Lions, Buffalo Bills, Houston Texans, Philadelphia Eagles, San Francisco 49ers, and Baltimore Ravens.

Early years
Lewis played at Hialeah-Miami Lakes High School. As a senior, he was evaluated as the nation's 10th-best dual-threat quarterback and 65th-best quarterback overall. He led his team to the state playoffs that year, passing for 12 touchdowns and only three interceptions.

College career

Lewis played college football for the Duke Blue Devils. While at Duke he set school records for career passing touchdowns and career passing yards. He also set Duke's school record for most consecutive pass attempts without an interception with 206. During his four years as a starting quarterback, he threw for 10,065 yards, 67 touchdowns and 40 interceptions, and ran for 9 touchdowns.

During his senior season, Lewis was a finalist for the Davey O'Brien Award, presented to the nation's top quarterback.

College statistics

Professional career

St. Louis Rams
Lewis signed with the Rams as an undrafted free agent soon after the 2010 NFL Draft.

Cleveland Browns
The Cleveland Browns claimed him off of waivers on September 4, 2011. Lewis was later waived by the Browns on October 11, 2012.  He was signed to the practice squad on October 13, 2012. He was again added to the Cleveland Browns active roster December 24, 2012 after injuries to Brandon Weeden and Colt McCoy.  He made his first career start when the Browns took on the Pittsburgh Steelers on December 30, 2012 and completed 22 of 32 passes for 204 yards with one touchdown and one interception. Notwithstanding Lewis' performance, the Browns lost 24–10. This performance was particularly noteworthy due to his strong performance against the first-ranked defense of the NFL during the 2012 season. Lewis was waived by the Browns on May 22, 2013.

Detroit Lions
The Detroit Lions claimed him off waivers on May 28, 2013. He looked to compete with 2012 undrafted free agent and former Heisman Trophy finalist Kellen Moore for the third quarterback position.

Buffalo Bills
On August 25, 2013, the Buffalo Bills traded linebacker Chris White for Lewis, due to the mounting quarterback injuries for the Bills. He was released on August 31, 2013 and signed to the practice squad September 1.  On October 7, 2013, coach Doug Marrone announced on WGR Sports Radio 550 that Lewis was promoted to the active roster from the practice squad after an injury to E. J. Manuel and started week 6 against the Cincinnati Bengals, over undrafted rookie Jeff Tuel, where he went 19/32 for 216 yards with 2 passing touchdowns and 0 interceptions and added 7 carries for 17 yards and 1 rushing touchdown. The Bills lost the game in overtime by a score of 27–24.

On October 20, 2013, Lewis went 21/32 for 202 yards with no touchdown passes and 1 interception. He also had 5 carries for 13 yards as he earned his first career victory against the Miami Dolphins by a score of 23–21. In a week 8 loss to the New Orleans Saints, Lewis completed 22 of 39 passes for 234 yards, 1 touchdown and 1 interception along with 2 rushes for 5 yards. This game is arguably his worst as he fumbled the ball 3 times. On November 3, 2013 against the Kansas City Chiefs in week 9, Tuel was named the starting quarterback, only to be replaced the following week by the original week 1 starter Manuel. Manuel started the next 5 games against the Pittsburgh Steelers, New York Jets, Atlanta Falcons, Tampa Bay Buccaneers, and Jacksonville Jaguars.

Lewis received his second win as a member of the Bills during Week 16 in a shutout victory over their division rival Dolphins with a score of 19–0. He went 15/25 for 193 yards with zero touchdowns and 1 interception while adding 8 carries for 13 yards. This loss would be a major factor for the Dolphins not making the playoffs since they needed to win just one of their final two games for a wildcard spot; which they lost both. In his final game as a Bill, Lewis played at Gillette Stadium against Tom Brady and the New England Patriots. Although Lewis outshone Brady on that day, by throwing for more yards than him and not throwing an interception like Brady did, his team lost to the Patriots by a score of 34–20. Lewis went 16/29 for 247 yards with 1 touchdown and no interceptions. He also added 2 carries for 4 yards. Thad Lewis finished his 2013 Bills season with a 2–3 record as Buffalo's starting quarterback. On August 26, 2014, Lewis was released from the Bills.

Houston Texans
Lewis signed with the Houston Texans on November 24, 2014, after starting quarterback Ryan Mallett suffered a season-ending injury.

Cleveland Browns (second stint)
The Browns signed Lewis on March 12, 2015. He was released from the team on September 5, 2015.

Philadelphia Eagles
Lewis signed with the Philadelphia Eagles on September 21, 2015.

San Francisco 49ers
Lewis signed with the San Francisco 49ers on March 10, 2016, reuniting him with former Eagles coach Chip Kelly. On August 16, 2016, the 49ers placed Lewis on injured reserve.

Baltimore Ravens
On August 14, 2017, Lewis signed with the Baltimore Ravens. On September 1, 2017, he was released by the Ravens during final roster cuts.

NFL career statistics

Coaching career
In January 2018, Lewis was hired by UCLA as an offensive analyst.

On July 22, 2020, Lewis was hired as an intern by the Tampa Bay Buccaneers. Following the 2020 NFL season, Lewis was hired as an offensive assistant. He was promoted to assistant wide receivers coach on May 5, 2021.

See also
List of Division I FBS passing yardage leaders

References

External links

 Buffalo Bills bio 
 Duke Blue Devils bio

1987 births
Living people
People from Hialeah, Florida
Players of American football from Florida
American football quarterbacks
Duke Blue Devils football players
St. Louis Rams players
Cleveland Browns players
Detroit Lions players
Buffalo Bills players
Houston Texans players
Philadelphia Eagles players
San Francisco 49ers players
Baltimore Ravens players
UCLA Bruins football coaches
Tampa Bay Buccaneers coaches